Itteren (Limburgish: Ittere) is a town in the Dutch province of Limburg. It is a part of the municipality of Maastricht, and lies about 6 km north of Maastricht.

Itteren was a separate municipality until 1970, when it was merged with Maastricht.

In 2001, Itteren had 977 inhabitants. The built-up area of the town was 0.25 km², and contained 396 residences.

References

External links
Official website
Website with pictures from Itteren

Populated places in Limburg (Netherlands)
Former municipalities of Limburg (Netherlands)
Neighbourhoods of Maastricht